Connor Lade (born November 16, 1989) is an American former professional soccer player. As a utility player, he played several positions during his professional career, most commonly as a right back. Lade currently serves as the Senior Manager of Alumni & Player Relations for the New York Red Bulls.

Career

College and amateur
Lade grew up in the Convent Station section of Morris Township, New Jersey and attended Morristown High School, where he received numerous accolades during his high school career. In December 2007 he joined the U.S. Soccer Development Academy and played with New York Red Bulls  Academy. In 2008, he decided to attend St. John's University. Lade was a four-year starter for St. Johns and helped the Red Storm to the 2009 & 2011 Big East tournament title.  Lade received the Defensive MVP award in the latter tournament.

During his time in college he remained with the Red Bulls Academy and was a member of the New York Red Bull NPSL squad.

Professional
Lade was signed by New York Red Bulls as a Home Grown Player on 5 December 2011. Lade made his professional debut for New York on 14 April 2012 in a 2–2 draw with San Jose Earthquakes. On 29 May 2012 Lade scored his first goal for New York in a 3–0 victory over the Charleston Battery in the third round of the US Open Cup.

After struggling to get the playing time he wanted during the 2014 MLS season, Lade was loaned to NASL club New York Cosmos on 28 July 2014. Lade quickly established himself in the Cosmos lineup and appeared in 8 league matches for the club. Lade was recalled by the Red Bulls during the NASL season and on 22 October 2014 scored his lone goal of the season helping the Red Bulls to a 1–1 draw against Montreal Impact in a 2014-15 CONCACAF Champions League match.

Lade was loaned to affiliate side New York Red Bulls II during the 2015 season and made his debut as a starter for the side on 4 April 2015 in a 4–1 victory over Toronto FC II, the first victory in club history. Lade was primarily used as a reserve during the early part of the 2015 season, however an injury to Chris Duvall provided him an opportunity at right back. He received glowing remarks for his play on 9 August 2015 in a 2-0 derby victory over New York City FC by coach Jesse Marsch.

Lade scored his first career MLS goal on 13 July 2016 in a 2–0 victory over Orlando City SC. It was announced on 9 August that Lade would miss the remainder of the 2016 season due to an ACL tear he suffered against the LA Galaxy.

On October 23, 2019, Lade announced his retirement from playing professional soccer.

International
During his college career Lade participated in training camps as part of the player pool for the United States under-20 national team but did not make any match appearances for the team.

In January 2013 Lade was called up to the U.S. senior national team for a friendly against Canada, but did not make an appearance in the match.

Managerial

In February 2020, the Red Bulls announced that Lade had been hired as the team's Senior Manager of Alumni & Player Relations. The club described the duties of the role as including "outreach to fellow club alumni, community outreach, media and broadcast opportunities, public appearances and a variety of other responsibilities".

Honors

Club
New York Red Bulls
MLS Supporters' Shield (3): 2013, 2015, 2018

Career statistics

References

External links
 
 St. John's profile

1989 births
Living people
American soccer players
St. John's Red Storm men's soccer players
Soccer players from New Jersey
Sportspeople from Morris County, New Jersey
People from Livingston, New Jersey
People from Morris Township, New Jersey
New York Red Bulls players
New York Cosmos (2010) players
New York Red Bulls II players
Major League Soccer players
North American Soccer League players
USL Championship players
Morristown High School (Morristown, New Jersey) alumni
Association football utility players
Association football defenders
Association football midfielders
Homegrown Players (MLS)